The 2017 South American Rugby Championship (Confederación Sudamericana de Rugby (CONSUR) Championship) Division A is the third edition of second level of the South American Rugby Championship. The tournament is played in a round-robin format with each team playing each other team once. The two first teams will win the right to compete in the top level tournament of South American Rugby Championship, called South America Rugby Cup, and the winner will face the loser of the two-game-series between USA and Canada as round 4 of the Americas qualification for the 2019 Rugby World Cup in Japan.

Standings

Pre-tournament rankings are in parentheses.

Matches

Week 1

Week 2

Week 3

See also
 2019 Rugby World Cup – Americas qualification

References

2017
2017 rugby union tournaments for national teams
A
rugby union
rugby union
rugby union
rugby union
International rugby union competitions hosted by Uruguay
International rugby union competitions hosted by Chile
International rugby union competitions hosted by Paraguay
International rugby union competitions hosted by Brazil